NGC 534 is a lenticular galaxy located in the constellation of Sculptor about 260 million light years from the Milky Way. It was discovered by the British astronomer John Herschel in 1835.

See also 
 List of NGC objects (1–1000)

References 

0534
Lenticular galaxies
Sculptor (constellation)
005215